Phylloxylon phillipsonii is a species of legume in the family Fabaceae. It is found only in Madagascar.

References

Indigofereae
Endemic flora of Madagascar
Critically endangered plants
Taxonomy articles created by Polbot